Mount Olive is a historic house in Natchez, Mississippi, USA.

History
The land belonged to William Foster in the early 19th century. By 1840, it was inherited by his great-niece, Eliza Tannehill Foster and her husband, Emmanuel Rigillio. The couple built a great house on the plantation from 1840 to 1843. It stayed in the Foster family until 1978, when it was sold to Bernard P. Wood.

Architectural significance
It has been listed on the National Register of Historic Places since November 28, 1980.

References

Houses on the National Register of Historic Places in Mississippi
Houses completed in 1843
Houses in Adams County, Mississippi
Plantations in Mississippi